This is a list of airports in Iraq, grouped by type and sorted by location.



List

See also 
 Transport in Iraq
 List of airports by ICAO code: O#OR - Iraq
 Wikipedia: WikiProject Aviation/Airline destination lists: Asia#Iraq

References 

Iraq
 
Airports
Airports
Iraq